The King Danylo University is a university in Prykarpattia Ukraine .

History
The University was founded in 1997 by a rector, a priest, an academician of the UAS, Doctor of Jurisprudence, Doctor of Law, Doctor of Philosophy, Doctor of Canon Law, Professor, an owner of the Excellence in Education of Ukraine Badge Father Ivan Lutskyi.

Structure
The structure of King Danylo University includes:
Faculty of Law
Faculty of Information Technology
Faculty of Architecture, Construction and Design 
Faculty of Management and Business Analysis
Faculty of Humanities
University College 
S. Hranat IFFC College 
Scientific Research Institute.

Specialty
The training of specialists is carried out in the following specialties: 
Law; 
Architecture and Urban Development;
Construction and Civil Engineering; 
Design; 
Philology (English Language); 
Accounting and Business Analysis; 
Financial Management;
Business and Private Entrepreneurship; 
Marketing;
Journalism (according to the educational and professional program «Advertising and Public Relations»); 
Software Engineering;
Computer Engineering;
Theology; 
Musical Arts;
Tourism; 
Hotel and Restaurant Business.

The lectures are given by lecturers and scientists from Ukraine, the United States,  Germany, Poland, France, Spain, Lithuania, Georgia, and Moldova.

For the majority of the enumerated specialties you can get education at the education and qualification level “Junior Specialist” at colleagues of the university.

Over 20,000 students have graduated from King Danylo University. The graduates get  State diplomas at the education and qualification levels: “Junior Specialist, “Bachelor’s” “Master’s degree” and also have the opportunity to get diplomas of higher education of foreign institutions according to principle of “Dual degree”

References
 Official site

Universities in Ukraine
Education in Ivano-Frankivsk
Law schools
Educational institutions established in 1997
1997 establishments in Ukraine